Kitab al-Buldan may refer to:
Kitab al-Buldan (Ya'qubi) (9th century).
Kitab al-Buldan (9th century) by Abu Hanifa Dinawari.
Mukhtasar Kitab al-Buldan (10th century) by ibn al-Faqih.
Kitāb Mu'jam al-Buldān by Yaqut al-Hamawi .